James Lowery may refer to:

Jamie Lowery (born 1961), former soccer player
Anybody Killa (born 1973), rapper
James R. Lowery (1884–1956), Alberta politician